The Musenalper Grat (1,785 m) is a mountain of the Uri Alps, overlooking Niederrickenbach in the Swiss canton of Nidwalden. It lies on the range south of Lake Lucerne.

A cable car links Niederrickenbach to the Ober Musenalp (1,747 m), near the summit of the mountain.

See also
List of mountains of Switzerland accessible by public transport

References

External links

Musenalper Grat on Hikr

Mountains of the Alps
Mountains of Nidwalden
Mountains of Switzerland
One-thousanders of Switzerland